Franck Roger Queudrue (born 27 August 1978) is a French former professional footballer who played as a left back. He began his career with Lens, for whom he played in Ligue 1, and went on to play in the Premier League for Middlesbrough, Fulham and Birmingham City, and in the Football League for Colchester United. He returned to Lens in 2010, and joined Red Star on a free transfer in 2012. Queudrue retired at the end of the 2012–13 season.

Queudrue played one match for France at B international level, and considered playing for the Republic of Ireland until being deemed ineligible by FIFA to play for them.

Early life
Franck Roger Queudrue was born on 27 August 1978 in Paris.

Club career

Lens
Queudrue began his football career in the youth system of RC Lens. He made 41 appearances for the club's reserve team in the Championnat de France Amateur (CFA) from the 1997–98 season onwards, scoring seven goals, and stepped up to the first team during the 1999–2000 season. His debut in Ligue 1 came as a second-half substitute against Montpellier on 16 October 1999, and during that first season he played 16 league games as well as 6 in the UEFA Cup. His first league goal came in his third appearance, a 90th-minute winner away to Marseille. He appeared frequently the following season, but made only two substitute appearances in 2001–02 before leaving for England on loan.

Middlesbrough
Queudrue joined English Premier League club Middlesbrough on loan in October 2001, and the deal was made permanent at the end of the season. He stayed until the summer of 2006. His preferred position was left-back, though he was comfortable at centre-back and, on certain occasions, played for Middlesbrough as a left or central midfielder. He was also renowned for his free kick and penalty converting ability.

He became popular with fans when he scored in his second game for the club – against North East rivals Sunderland. Queudrue impressed enough to earn a permanent move in May 2002 for a fee of £2.5 million. However, he was also recognised for his poor disciplinary record. His five yellow and three red cards in the 2002–03 season contributed hugely to Middlesbrough missing out on a place in the UEFA Cup through the fair play league – although, conversely, he was a major reason they were high enough up the league to be in contention. He was part of the Middlesbrough side, who beat Bolton Wanderers to win the 2004 League Cup final. He also started for Middlesbrough in the 2006 UEFA Cup Final which they lost 4–0 to Sevilla in Eindhoven.

In 2006, Queudrue announced that he was considering switching his nationality to British, after becoming eligible for UK citizenship. He had previously hoped to claim Irish citizenship, before revealing "unfortunately I am one generation out" to be eligible.

Fulham
Queudrue left for Fulham, signing a four-year contract in July 2006. Queudrue was a regular for Fulham under Chris Coleman, but he was made available for transfer by new manager Lawrie Sanchez, as he did not agree with Sanchez's long-ball game. He scored once in the league for Fulham, an injury time equaliser against Charlton Athletic.

Birmingham City

On 3 August 2007, Queudrue signed a three-year contract with Birmingham City for a fee estimated at £2.5 million. After Birmingham's relegation at the end of the 2007–08 season, co-owner David Sullivan claimed he should have intervened to stop manager Steve Bruce "buying a pile of rubbish" and singled out Queudrue as "a major disappointment". Sullivan's apology the next day was accepted, but after Queudrue reported back late for pre-season training, he was told he could leave on a free transfer. However, he returned to the team the following season, produced man-of-the-match performances, and in October Sullivan issued a public apology in the match programme. Voted player of the season both by the fans and by the local newspaper, the Birmingham Mail, Queudrue also received personal message of congratulation from Sullivan via the club website.

In March 2010, Queudrue joined Colchester United of League One on loan for the remainder of the 2009–10 season, but injury restricted him to just three appearances. On his return to Birmingham, the club announced that he would be released when his contract expired at the end of June 2010.

Return to Lens
Queudrue had a trial at Peterborough United, but was reported to have joined Greece Super League club Panionios instead. However, he chose not to proceed with that move for family reasons, and after several weeks training with his first club, RC Lens, he rejoined them on 27 September until the end of the season.

Red Star
On 1 August 2012, Queudrue signed a two-year contract with Red Star on a free transfer. He scored his first goal for the club in a 3–0 win over Cherbourg, and his second in a 1–1 draw with Quevilly.

International career
While a Lens player in 2000, Queudrue earned one cap for the France B national football team. He was hopeful of being able to represent Republic of Ireland as he believed he had an Irish grandfather, but it was later discovered he in fact had an Irish great-grandfather, thus making him ineligible.

Career statistics

Honours
Middlesbrough
Football League Cup: 2004
UEFA Cup runner-up: 2006

References

External links

Fulham FC profile

1978 births
Living people
Footballers from Paris
French footballers
Association football defenders
RC Lens players
Middlesbrough F.C. players
Fulham F.C. players
Birmingham City F.C. players
Colchester United F.C. players
Red Star F.C. players
Ligue 1 players
Premier League players
English Football League players
Ligue 2 players
French expatriate footballers
Expatriate footballers in England
French expatriate sportspeople in England
French people of Irish descent